Nam Jie-youn (born May 25, 1983 in Seoul) is a former South Korean volleyball player, who played as a libero. She was a member of the Women's National Team. She plays for Hwaseong IBK Altos. She was part of the silver medal winning team at the 2010 Asian Games.

At the end of the 2017-18 season, she announced her retirement of the courts. She is currently the press officer of Hwaseong IBK Altos.

Awards

Individuals
 2003 World Grand Prix "Best Digger"
 2011 Asian Championship "Best Libero"
 2011 World Cup "Best Libero"
 2015 Asian Championship "Best Libero"

References

External links
 FIVB profile
 KOVO profile 
 
 Nam Jie-youn on Facebook

1983 births
Living people
South Korean women's volleyball players
Asian Games medalists in volleyball
Volleyball players at the 2006 Asian Games
Volleyball players at the 2010 Asian Games
Volleyball players at the 2014 Asian Games
Volleyball players at the 2004 Summer Olympics
Olympic volleyball players of South Korea
People from Gangneung
Asian Games gold medalists for South Korea
Asian Games silver medalists for South Korea
Medalists at the 2010 Asian Games
Medalists at the 2014 Asian Games
Volleyball players at the 2016 Summer Olympics
Sportspeople from Gangwon Province, South Korea